Pallas's sandgrouse (Syrrhaptes paradoxus) is a medium to large bird in the sandgrouse family.

Naming

Marco Polo mentions a bird called Bargherlac (from Turkmen bağırlak) in The Travels of Marco Polo, published around 1300. This is probably Syrrhaptes paradoxus (S. pallasii).

Pallas's sandgrouse is named after the German zoologist Peter Simon Pallas.  The scientific name is from Ancient Greek. The genus Syrrhaptes is from surrhaptos, meaning "sewn together" (the feathered toes of both species in the genus are fused together) and paradoxus is from paradoxos, meaning "strange".

Description

It has long pointed wings and tail and legs and toes are feathered. Its plumage is buff-coloured, barred above with a black belly patch and pale underwings. The black belly and pale underwing distinguish this species from the related Tibetan sandgrouse. The male Pallas's sandgrouse is distinguished by its grey head and breast, orange face and grey breast band. The female has duller plumage and lacks the breast band though it has more barring on the upperparts.

The small feet lack a hind toe, and the three front toes are fused together. The upper surface is feathered, and the underneath has a fleshy pad. The appearance of the foot is more like a paw than an avian foot.

Distribution and habitat

This species breeds across middle latitudes of central Asia on dry steppes and similar habitats. Its nest is a ground scrape into which 2–3 greenish eggs with cryptic markings are laid.

It is a partial migrant, especially from the northern parts of its range in Kazakhstan and Mongolia, but the extent and distance of the southerly winter movement depends on the amount of snowfall.

Pallas's sandgrouse occasionally irrupts from its regular breeding and wintering range as a vagrant across Europe as far west as Great Britain, where it has bred, and Ireland. The reasons for these remarkable movements are not fully understood, but they have become less frequent, probably due to contraction of the western Siberian range as the steppes become more agricultural.

Diet
Due to their primarily dry diet of seeds, the sandgrouse needs to drink a large volume of water. The sandgrouse's wing morphology allows for fast flight with speeds up to  having been recorded. Male parents soak their breast plumage in water while drinking, allowing their chicks to drink from the absorbed moisture on their return.

References

External links

 Nine photographs (see pulldown menu at page bottom) at The Oriental Bird Club
 
 
 
 
 
 
 
 

Pallas's sandgrouse
Birds of Central Asia
Birds of Mongolia
Birds of North China
Birds of Manchuria
Pallas's sandgrouse